Stephen Silberkraus (born April 4, 1981) is a Republican former Nevada Assemblyman representing District 29, which covers Green Valley and downtown Henderson. Silberkraus received nearly 55% of the vote in the 2014 general election defeating Democratic appointed incumbent Lesley Cohen by 9.5%. After Silberkraus supported the largest tax increase in Nevada's history in the 2015 session, Cohen regained the seat in the 2016 general election, defeating Silberkraus by 0.74%.

Stephen Silberkraus is running in the 2020 election for the Nevada System of Higher Education Board of Regents in District 3. 
 The Board of Regents is a state government unit in Nevada that oversees its public system of colleges and universities. These include two doctoral-granting research universities, one state college, four community colleges, and one research institute comprise the system.

Silberkraus is a multimedia professional and published author. His most recent publication is "The Space Shuttle Endeavour" by Arcadia Publishing. Silberkraus appeared as an extra in numerous television shows and movies, including The West Wing, Entourage, and Buffy the Vampire Slayer.

References

External links
 Campaign Website
 

1981 births
Living people
Republican Party members of the Nevada Assembly
People from the Las Vegas Valley
21st-century American politicians